Prudencio Cardona (December 22, 1951 – August 4, 2019) was a Colombian professional boxer who was world flyweight champion. He represented his native country at the 1972 Summer Olympics in Munich, West Germany. He is the older brother of former super bantamweight world champion, Ricardo Cardona.

Professional boxing career
Prudencio Cardona made his professional boxing debut on November 2, 1973 defeating Luis Ramos by a four-round decision in Barranquilla, Colombia. Twenty two days later, Cardona earned his first knockout win, knocking out Humberto Ortega in four rounds at Barranquilla. Cardona's first seven fights were in Barranquilla; he won five of these bouts by knockout.

On September 29, 1974, Cardona fought away from Barranquilla for the first time, losing his tag as an undefeated fighter when he dropped an eight-round decision to Henry Diaz in Cartagena. Seven weeks later, Prudencio Cardona had his first professional contest in Bogotá, knocking out Ben Villareal in two rounds on November 23. Cardona then won one fight and lost another before having his first bout abroad, on August 9, 1975, when he fought Luis Reyes Arnal in Caracas, Venezuela, defeating Reyes Arnal by a fifth-round knockout. Cardona won seven more fights before returning to Venezuela, where he boxed Betulio González on March 12, 1977, being knocked out in the third round.

Five victories followed his defeat at the hands of Gonzalez. These included a third-round knockout win over Villareal in a rematch, a ten-round decision over future world champion Alfonso Lopez on March 10, 1978, and another win against a future world champion, Luis Ibarra, by decision in ten rounds on June 30, at Barranquilla.

Ibarra and Cardona had an immediate rematch, on February 17, 1979, in Colón, Panama, with Ibarra avenging his loss to Cardona by a ten-round decision. 
On June 15 of that year, Cardona made his Asian debut, losing to future world champion Seung-Hoon Lee by a ten-round decision in South Korea.

Cardona, however, won nine of his next ten fights by knockout, including victories over Hector Patri, Steve Whitstone and Olympic bronze medalist Orlando Maldonado of Puerto Rico.

World Flyweight championship
These nine wins made Cardona a ranked Flyweight on the WBC, and, on March 20, 1982, he challenged Antonio Avelar for the WBC and Lineal Flyweight titles, in Tampico, Tamaulipas, Mexico. Cardona became world champion by knocking Avelar out in the first round. He lost the titles on his first defense, however, being defeated by two division world champion and another Mexican Freddie Castillo by a fifteen-round unanimous decision on July 24, also in Mexico. Castillo went on to lose the championships to Eleoncio Mercedes.

Cardona won four of his next five bouts, the exception being a ten-round draw (tie), against Soon-Jung Kang on April 2, 1983 in South Korea. On September 15, 1984, Cardona had a chance to become world Flyweight champion for the second time, when he faced WBA world champion Santos Laciar in Argentina. Laciar defeated Cardona by a tenth-round knockout. This was the last world title fight of Cardona's career.

Cardona's career then began to take backwards turns, winning three and losing two of his next five bouts. He did win the national, Colombian Flyweight title by knocking out Toribio Velasco in three rounds on December 14, 1985. But after retaining the title against Josélo Perez on April 5, 1986 by a ten-round decision, Cardona lost his next eight bouts in a row. Included  were losses to future world Bantamweight champion Orlando Canizales, who knocked Cardona out on January 30, 1987 in San Antonio, Texas, United States, a ten-round decision loss to Ray Minus on March 5 at the Bahamas, and a ten-round points loss to Juan Polo Perez on May 25 in Cartagena.

On November 27 of that year, Cardona obtained his last victory as a professional, knocking out Teofilo Centeno in the first round at Miami, Florida.

Cardona lost his next five fights before retiring. Among those that beat him were various well-known fighters,  such as Dominican Tommy Valoy, then a future world title challenger, by a knockout in six in San Juan, Puerto Rico, future world champion Jose Ruiz, who beat Cardona by a ninth-round knockout on July 11, 1988, also at San Juan, and Darryl Pinckney, who knocked Cardona out in four rounds on June 27, 1992.

The fight with Pinckney turned out to be the last fight boxed by Cardona as a professional. He had also previously lost to Agapito Gómez by a second round disqualification, in Madrid, Spain.

Cardona had a professional boxing record of 40 wins, 23 losses and one draw, with 27 wins by knockout.

Personal
His brother, Ricardo Cardona, was also a well-known world champion boxer, making the Cardona brothers one of the small numbers of sibling couples to have reached world championship status in the sport. He is the father of AEW wrestler Red Velvet. He died on August 4, 2019 at the age of 67.

Professional boxing record

See also
List of flyweight boxing champions
List of WBC world champions

References

External links
 
 Prudencio Cardona - CBZ Profile

1951 births
2019 deaths
Flyweight boxers
World boxing champions
World flyweight boxing champions
World Boxing Council champions
Boxers at the 1972 Summer Olympics
Olympic boxers of Colombia
People from Bolívar Department
Colombian male boxers
Colombian people of African descent